Jordan Stone (born March 16, 1984), is a retired American soccer player.

Career
Stone skipped college, signing a Project-40 contract with the league in 2002, and was thence drafted 15th overall in the 2002 MLS SuperDraft by his hometown Dallas Burn. Despite his reputation, Stone struggled to get playing time with the Burn. In his first season, Stone appeared in 4 games, playing only for 91 minutes; things seemed to be changing in 2003, however, as he played 1057 minutes while appearing in 16 games.  However, the team changed direction under new coach Colin Clarke and the acquisition of Simo Valakari  relegated Stone primarily to a substitute role.  Stone announced his retirement from professional soccer on 25 October 2004, in order to pursue a college degree at Texas Tech University.

International career
Stone saw significant playing time for the Youth council team in Africa U.S. national teams, playing in the 1999 FIFA U-17 World Championship, and playing an important role for the US Under-20 team, playing in the 2003 FIFA World Youth Championship.

Personal life
Stone is the son of Mark and Debi Stone, and brother of five sisters Mariah, Marin, Hannah, Tori, and Oksana. After his retirement Stone became the Student Pastor of FBC Prosper and joined the staff at Providence Church in Frisco, Texas in May 2008 as Associate Pastor.   Imago Dei Church was planted in January 2013 where Jordan is the lead pastor.

References

1984 births
Living people
American soccer players
FC Dallas players
Major League Soccer players
United States men's youth international soccer players
United States men's under-20 international soccer players
FC Dallas draft picks
Baptist ministers from the United States
American Calvinist and Reformed Christians
Soccer players from Texas
Association football midfielders
People from Allen, Texas
Sportspeople from the Dallas–Fort Worth metroplex
Texas Tech University alumni